Holy See–Venezuela relations are foreign relations between the Holy See and Venezuela. Both countries established diplomatic relations in 1869. The Holy See has a nunciature in Caracas. Venezuela has an embassy in Rome.

History 
There have been tensions with the Vatican under the presidency of Hugo Chávez, a president who while being Catholic is ideologically influenced by Karl Marx and Vladimir Lenin, political thinkers that have historically been opposed to the influence of the Roman Catholic Church. Chávez also cites his support for the liberation theology of Leonardo Boff, which Rome had opposed in the 1970s and 1980s.

In 2009, pro-government colectivos tear-gassed the Vatican envoy after Chávez accused the Roman Catholic Church of interfering with his government.

See also 
 Apostolic Nuncio to Venezuela

References

External links
Venezuela (Nunciature)
Pope tells Chavez of Venezuelan concerns

 
Venezuela
Bilateral relations of Venezuela